The 2022 Youngstown State Penguins baseball team was a baseball team that represented Youngstown State University in the 2022 NCAA Division I baseball season. The Penguins were members of the Horizon League and played their home games at Eastwood Field in Niles, Ohio. They were led by sixth-year head coach Dan Bertolini.

Previous season
The Penguins finished the 2021 NCAA Division I baseball season 32–24 overall (24–16 conference) and third place in the conference standings. It was their first winning season since 2005, and their first thirty win season since 1995.

Roster

Schedule

! colspan=2 style="" | Regular Season
|- valign="top"

|- align="center" bgcolor="#ffcccc"
| 1 || February 18 || at  || Radiology Associates Field at Jackie Robinson Ballpark • Daytona Beach, Florida || 1–3 || Lipthratt (1–0) || Snyder (0–1) || Vazquez (1) || 312 || 0–1 || –
|- align="center" bgcolor="#ccffcc"
| 2 || February 19 || at Bethune–Cookman || Radiology Associates Field at Jackie Robinson Ballpark • Daytona Beach, Florida || 7–6 || Perez (1–0) || Santos (0–1) || Ball (1) || 218 || 1–1 || –
|- align="center" bgcolor="#ccffcc"
| 3 || February 20 || at Bethune–Cookman || Radiology Associates Field at Jackie Robinson Ballpark • Daytona Beach, Florida || 10–9 || Brosky (1–0) || Gonzalez (0–1) || Ball (2) || 295 || 2–1 || –
|- align="center" bgcolor="#ffcccc"
| 4 || February 25 || at  || E. S. Rose Park • Nashville, Tennessee || 1–3 || South (1–0) || Snyder (0–2) || Brennan (2) || 117 || 2–2 || –
|- align="center" bgcolor="#ffcccc"
| 5 || February 26 || at Belmont || E. S. Rose Park • Nashville, Tennessee || 0–4 || Perry (0–1) || Bean (2–0) || None || 120 || 2–3 || –
|- align="center" bgcolor="#ffcccc"
| 6 || February 26 || at Belmont || E. S. Rose Park • Nashville, Tennessee || 2–5 || Baratta (2–0) || Coles (0–1) || Brennan (3) || 120 || 2–4 || –
|- align="center" bgcolor="#ffcccc"
| 7 || February 27 || at Belmont || E. S. Rose Park • Nashville, Tennessee || 0–2 || Jenkins (1–0) || Brosky (1–1) || Brennan (4) || 130 || 2–5 || –
|-

|- align="center" bgcolor="#ffcccc"
| 8 || March 4 || at  || UTRGV Baseball Stadium • Edinburg, Texas || 4–6 || Stevens (2–0) || Snyder (0–3) || Gerik Jr. (1) || 1,591 || 2–6 || –
|- align="center" bgcolor="#ffcccc"
| 9 || March 5 || at Texas–Rio Grande Valley || UTRGV Baseball Stadium • Edinburg, Texas || 4–8 || Davis (2–0) || Ball (0–1) || None || 1,318 || 2–7 || –
|- align="center" bgcolor="#ffcccc"
| 10 || March 5 || at Texas–Rio Grande Valley || UTRGV Baseball Stadium • Edinburg, Texas || 8–11 || Rosenbaum (1–0) || Perez (0–1) || Balderrama Jr. (1) || 1,318 || 2–8 || –
|- align="center" bgcolor="#ccffcc"
| 11 || March 6 || at Texas–Rio Grande Valley || UTRGV Baseball Stadium • Edinburg, Texas || 3–2 || Marshalwitz (1–0) || Aldaz (0–1) || Ball (3) || 847 || 3–8 || –
|- align="center" bgcolor=#ccffcc
| 12 || March 11 || at New Orleans || Maestri Field at Privateer Park • New Orleans, Louisiana || 6–5 || Milkos (1–0) || Seroski (1–1) || Ball (4) || 145 || 4–8 || –
|- align="center" bgcolor=#ffcccc
| 13 || March 12 || at New Orleans || Maestri Field at Privateer Park • New Orleans, Louisiana || 7–8 || Gauthe (1–0) || Ball (0–2) || None || 244 || 4–9 || –
|- align="center" bgcolor=#ccffcc
| 14 || March 12 || at New Orleans || Maestri Field at Privateer Park • New Orleans, Louisiana || 3–2  || Perry (1–1) || Mitchell (0–1) || Perez (1) || 658 || 5–9 || –
|- align="center" bgcolor=#ffcccc
| 15 || March 13 || at New Orleans || Maestri Field at Privateer Park • New Orleans, Louisiana || 0–1 || Williams (3–0) || Brosky (1–2) || None || 475 || 5–10 || –
|- align="center" bgcolor=#ccffcc
| 16 || March 16 || at Pittsburgh || Petersen Sports Complex • Pittsburgh, Pennsylvania || 5–2 || Mikos (2–0) || Miller (0–1) || None || 240 || 6–10 || –
|- align="center" bgcolor=#ccffcc
| 17 || March 18 || at Purdue Fort Wayne || Mastodon Field • Fort Wayne, Indiana || 4–0 || Snyder (1–3) || Stills (0–2) || None || 174 || 7–10 || 1–0
|- align="center" bgcolor=#ffcccc
| 18 || March 20 || vs Purdue Fort Wayne || Defiance High School • Defiance, Ohio || 7–8 || Wilson (1–1) || Marshalwitz (1–1) || None || 125 || 7–11 || 1–1
|- align="center" bgcolor=#ccffcc
| 19 || March 20 || vs Purdue Fort Wayne || Defiance High School • Defiance, Ohio || 12–6 || Brosky (2–2) || Miller (0–5) || None || 155 || 8–11 || 2–1
|- align="center" bgcolor=#ccffcc
| 20 || March 22 || at  || Medlar Field • University Park, Pennsylvania || 2–1 || Cardona (1–0) || Mellott (1–2) || Ball (5) || 338 || 9–11 || 2–1
|- align="center" bgcolor=#ffcccc
| 21 || March 24 || at West Virginia || Monongalia County Ballpark • Granville, West Virginia || 4–6 || Bravo (1–0) || Rhodes (0–1) || Braithwaite (1) || 1,379 || 9–12 || 2–1
|- align="center" bgcolor=#ffcccc
| 22 || March 25 || at West Virginia || Monongalia County Ballpark • Granville, West Virginia || 3–9 || Hampton (4–1) || Coles (0–2) || None || 1,030 || 9–13 || 2–1
|- align="center" bgcolor=#ffcccc
| 23 || March 25 || at West Virginia || Monongalia County Ballpark • Granville, West Virginia || 2–13 || Watters (2–1) || Brosky (2–3) || None || 1,066 || 9–14 || 2–1
|- align="center" bgcolor=#ffcccc
| 24 || March 30 || at  || Drayton McLane Baseball Stadium at John H. Kobs Field • East Lansing, Michigan || 5–12 || Carson (2–0) || Perez (1–2) || None || 155 || 9–15 || 2–1
|-

|- align="center" bgcolor=#ffcccc
| 25 || April 1 || at  || Oakland Baseball Field • Rochester, Michigan || 6–11 || Hagen (3–1) || Snyder (1–4) || None || 115 || 9–16 || 2–2
|- align="center" bgcolor=#ccffcc
| 26 || April 2 || at Oakland || Oakland Baseball Field • Rochester, Michigan || 4–2 || Cole (1–2) || Decker (2–2) || None || 127 || 10–16 || 3–2
|- align="center" bgcolor=#ffcccc
| 27 || April 3 || at Oakland || Oakland Baseball Field • Rochester, Michigan || 1–14 || Densmore (2–0) || Brosky (2–4) || None || 145 || 10–17 || 3–3
|- align="center" bgcolor=#ffcccc
| 28 || April 5 || at  || Bill Davis Stadium • Columbus, Ohio || 4–5 || Johnson (1–2) || Ball (0–3) || None || 490 || 10–18 || 3–3
|- align="center" bgcolor=#ffcccc
| 29 || April 6 || Pittsburgh || Eastwood Field • Niles, Ohio || 1–9 || Devereux (3–0) || Perez (1–3) || None || 165 || 10–19 || 3–3
|- align="center" bgcolor=#ffcccc
| 30 || April 8 ||  || Eastwood Field • Niles, Ohio || 0–9 || Bohlen (1–0) || Snyder (1–5) || Gerl (1) || 157 || 10–20 || 3–4
|- align="center" bgcolor=#ffcccc
| 31 || April 9 || Northern Kentucky || Eastwood Field • Niles, Ohio || 3–15 || Klingenbeck (2–4) || Mikos (2–1) || Longsbury (3) || 153 || 10–21 || 3–5
|- align="center" bgcolor=#ffcccc
| 32 || April 10 || Northern Kentucky || Eastwood Field • Niles, Ohio || 7–9 || Echeman (1–5) || Brosky (2–5) || Mulhern (1) || 193 || 10–22 || 3–6
|- align="center" bgcolor=#ffcccc
| 33 || April 12 ||  || Eastwood Field • Niles, Ohio || 3–5 || Krawiec (1–0) || Cardona (1–1) || Cameron (1) || 170 || 10–23 || 3–6
|- align="center" bgcolor=#ccffcc
| 34 || April 14 ||  || Eastwood Field • Niles, Ohio || 4–2 || Coles (2–2) || Frey (3–3) || Ball (7) || 211 || 11–23 || 4–6
|- align="center" bgcolor=#ffcccc
| 35 || April 15 || Milwaukee || Eastwood Field • Niles, Ohio || 13–17 || Kaufmann (1–0) || Marshalwitz (1–2) || None || 195 || 11–24 || 4–7
|- align="center" bgcolor=#ccffcc
| 36 || April 16 || Milwaukee || Eastwood Field • Niles, Ohio || 15–4 || Brosky (3–5) || Gilhaus (1–3) || None || 210 || 12–24 || 5–7
|- align="center" bgcolor="#dddddd"
| – || April 19 || at  || Schoonover Stadium • Kent, Ohio ||colspan=12| Game cancelled
|- align="center" bgcolor=#ccffcc
| 37 || April 22 || Oakland || Eastwood Field • Niles, Ohio || 2–1 || Brosky (4–4) || Decker (3–4) || None || 213 || 13–24 || 6–7
|- align="center" bgcolor=#ccffcc
| 38 || April 22 || Oakland || Eastwood Field • Niles, Ohio || 2–1 || Perry (2–1) || Densmore (3–2) || None || 213 || 14–24 || 7–7
|- align="center" bgcolor=#ccffcc
| 39 || April 24 || at Milwaukee || Franklin Field • Franklin, Wisconsin || 11–2 || Coles (3–2) || Schulfer (2–2) || None || 423 || 15–24 || 8–7
|- align="center" bgcolor=#ffcccc
| 40 || April 24 || at Milwaukee || Franklin Field • Franklin, Wisconsin || 4–17 || Turnquist (1–0) || Rhodes (0–2) || None || 423 || 15–25 || 8–8
|- align="center" bgcolor=#ffcccc
| 41 || April 26 || at Niagara || Bobo Field • Lewiston, New York || 1–3 || Laird (1–2) || Perez (1–3) || Erwin (2) || 112 || 15–26 || 8–8
|- align="center" bgcolor=#ffcccc
| 42 || April 29 || at  || Nischwitz Stadium • Dayton, Ohio || 3–4 || Shirk (5–4) || Brosky (4–6) || Luikart (5) || 137 || 15–27 || 8–9
|- align="center" bgcolor=#ffcccc
| 43 || April 30 || at Wright State || Nischwitz Stadium • Dayton, Ohio || 3–10 || Gongora (3–1) || Perry (2–2) || None || 318 || 15–28 || 8–10
|-

|- align="center" bgcolor=#ffcccc
| 44 || May 1 || at Wright State || Nischwitz Stadium • Dayton, Ohio || 3–10 || Theis (4–0) || Coles (3–3) || None || 231 || 15–30 || 8–11
|- align="center" bgcolor=#dddddd
| – || May 3 || at Michigan || Ray Fisher Stadium • Ann Arbor, Michigan ||colspan=12| Game cancelled
|- align="center" bgcolor=#dddddd
| – || May 6 || Purdue Fort Wayne || Eastwood Field • Niles, Ohio ||colspan=12| Game cancelled
|- align="center" bgcolor=#dddddd
| – || May 6 || Purdue Fort Wayne || Eastwood Field • Niles, Ohio ||colspan=12| Game cancelled
|- align="center" bgcolor=#ffcccc
| 45 || May 8 || Wright State || Eastwood Field • Niles, Ohio || 1–3 || Theis (5–0) || Brosky (4–7) || Luikart (6) || 311 || 15–30 || 8–12
|- align="center" bgcolor=#ffcccc
| 46 || May 8 || Wright State || Eastwood Field • Niles, Ohio || 6–9 || Haught (3–1) || Coles (3–4) || Nonte || 311 || 15–31 || 8–13
|- align="center" bgcolor=#ccffcc
| 47 || May 13 || at  || Les Miller Field at Curtis Granderson Stadium • Chicago, Illinois || 8–3 || Brosky (5–7) || Peterson (4–5) || None || 249 || 16–31 || 9–13
|- align="center" bgcolor=#ffcccc
| 48 || May 13 || at UIC || Les Miller Field at Curtis Granderson Stadium • Chicago, Illinois || 3–7 || Ingram (4–4) || Rhodes (0–3) || None || 298 || 16–32 || 9–14
|- align="center" bgcolor=#ccffcc
| 49 || May 15 || at Northern Kentucky || Bill Aker Baseball Complex • Highland Heights, Kentucky || 5–3 || Coles (4–4) || Gerl (3–6) || Ball (9) || 117 || 17–32 || 10–14
|- align="center" bgcolor=#ffcccc
| 50 || May 15 || at Northern Kentucky || Bill Aker Baseball Complex • Highland Heights, Kentucky || 0–8 || Klingenbeck (3–6) || Perry (2–3) || None || 98 || 17–33 || 10–15
|- align="center" bgcolor=#ccffcc
| 51 || May 19 || UIC || Eastwood Field • Niles, Ohio || 6–4 || Ball (1–3) || Zack (2–2) || None || 201 || 18–33 || 11–15
|- align="center" bgcolor=#ccffcc
| 52 || May 20 || UIC || Eastwood Field • Niles, Ohio || 10–6 || Perry (3–3) || Morris (1–2) || Coles (1) || 3,583 || 19–33 || 12–15
|- align="center" bgcolor=#ffcccc
| 53 || May 21 || UIC || Eastwood Field • Niles, Ohio || 6–18 || Torres (2–2) || Rhodes (0–4) || None || 214 || 19–34 || 12–16
|-

|-
! style="" | Postseason
|- valign="top" 

|- align="center" bgcolor=#ccffcc
| 54 || May 25 || vs Purdue Fort Wayne || Nischwitz Stadium • Dayton, Ohio || 6–0 || Brosky (6–7) || Deany (5–3) || None || 122 || 20–34 || 1–0
|- align="center" bgcolor=#ffcccc
| 55 || May 26 || vs Oakland || Nischwitz Stadium • Dayton, Ohio || 0–2 || Kujawa (4–1) || Coles (4–5) || Decker (3) || 173 || 20–35 || 1–1
|- align="center" bgcolor=#ccffcc
| 56 || May 26 || vs Northern Kentucky || Nischwitz Stadium • Dayton, Ohio || 11–7 || Perry (4–3) || Echeman (2–9) || None || 187 || 21–35 || 2–1
|- align="center" bgcolor=#ffcccc
| 57 || May 27 || vs Oakland || Nischwitz Stadium • Dayton, Ohio || 2–4 || Densmore (5–3) || Ball (1–4) || Decker (4) || 156 || 21–36 || 2–2
|-

Awards

Horizon League Players of the Week

Conference awards

References

Youngstown State
Youngstown State Penguins baseball seasons
Youngstown State